is a 2016 Japanese crime horror thriller film directed by Keishi Ōtomo. It is based on the 2013 manga of the same name by Ryosuke Tomoe. It was released in Japan by Warner Bros. Pictures on November 12, 2016.

Plot

Recently divorced and miserable Detective Hisashi Sawamura (Shun Oguri) and his naive rookie partner Nishino (Shuhei Nomura) search for a Tokyo serial killer named Sanae Kirishima (Satoshi Tsumabuki), who wears a cartoonish giant frog costume.

Cast
Shun Oguri as Detective Hisashi Sawamura
Satoshi Tsumabuki as Sanae Kirishima, the serial killer who wears a cartoonish frog costume
Machiko Ono as Haruka Sawamura
Shūhei Nomura as Junichi Nishino
Tomomi Maruyama as Tsuyoshi Sugawara
Tomoko Tabata as Kayo Akiyama
Mikako Ichikawa as Mikie Tachibana
Masatō Ibu as Toshio Okabe
Yutaka Matsushige as Kozo Sekihata
Nao Ōmori as Hisashi's father

References

External links 
 
 

2016 thriller films
Films directed by Keishi Ōtomo
Films scored by Taro Iwashiro
2010s Japanese-language films
Japanese serial killer films
Japanese thriller films
Live-action films based on manga
Warner Bros. films
2010s Japanese films